Woody Harrelson is an American actor who made his film debut as an uncredited extra in Harper Valley PTA (1978). His breakthrough role was as bartender Woody Boyd on the NBC sitcom Cheers (1985–1993), which garnered Harrelson a Primetime Emmy Award for Outstanding Supporting Actor in a Comedy Series from a total of five nominations. He would later reprise the character in other television shows, such as Frasier and The Simpsons. In 1992, Harrelson starred opposite Wesley Snipes in White Men Can't Jump. He then appeared in the Oliver Stone-directed Natural Born Killers (1994) alongside Tommy Lee Jones and Robert Downey Jr. For his performance as free-speech activist Larry Flynt in The People vs. Larry Flynt (1996) he was nominated for a Golden Globe Award for Best Actor and an Academy Award for Best Actor. He next appeared in The Thin Red Line (1998).

From 1999 to 2000, Harrelson acted in the Broadway revival of The Rainmaker. He then had a minor role in the 2003 comedy Anger Management. From 2005 to 2006, Harrelson played Rev. Shannon in a London production of Tennessee Williams' The Night of the Iguana. His next film role was as hit-man Carson Wells in the Coen brothers-directed No Country for Old Men (2007), which won the Academy Award for Best Picture. That year he also portrayed physician Robert O. Wilson in the documentary Nanking. In 2008, Harrelson starred opposite Will Ferrell in Semi-Pro and Will Smith in Seven Pounds. His work in The Messenger (2009) garnered him an Independent Spirit Award for Best Supporting Male. He then starred in Zombieland (2009), later returning to the franchise in Zombieland: Double Tap (2019).

Harrelson starred as Haymitch Abernathy in The Hunger Games (2012). He would return to the role for three more films: The Hunger Games: Catching Fire (2013), The Hunger Games: Mockingjay – Part 1 (2014), and The Hunger Games: Mockingjay – Part 2 (2015). He then played the title role in the 2016 biopic LBJ. For his performance in Three Billboards Outside Ebbing, Missouri (2017), Harrelson was nominated for an Academy Award for Best Supporting Actor and a BAFTA Award for Best Actor in a Supporting Role, but he lost both to co-star Sam Rockwell. That year, he also portrayed the militaristic "Colonel" in War for the Planet of the Apes. The following year, he appeared in the Ron Howard-directed Solo: A Star Wars Story (2018). He then portrayed Admiral Chester Nimitz in the Roland Emmerich-directed Midway (2019), after having a minor role in Emmerich's 2012 (2009). During the 2020 Democratic presidential primaries, he portrayed candidate Joe Biden for multiple episodes of Saturday Night Live. In 2021, Harrelson portrayed serial killer Cletus Kasady and voiced the symbiote Carnage in the Sony's Spider-Man Universe (SSU) film Venom: Let There Be Carnage, having first played the former character in a mid-credits cameo in Venom (2018).

Film

Television

Theatre

See also 
 List of awards and nominations received by Woody Harrelson

References

External links 
 

Male actor filmographies
American filmographies